Stefan Charles (born June 9, 1988) is a professional Canadian football defensive tackle who is a free agent. He was most recently a member of the Edmonton Elks of the Canadian Football League (CFL). He played CIS football with the Regina Rams.

University career
Charles played three seasons of CIS football with the Regina Rams. In 22 career games at Regina, he posted 19.5 tackles for losses, 9.5 sacks and 50 tackles. An injury to his hand caused him to miss much of his 4th season with the Rams. Prior to joining the Regina Rams, he was a member of the Metro Toronto Wildcats of the OVFL.

Professional career

CFL Draft
Charles was ranked No. 1 overall in the Canadian Football League Scouting Bureau's September rankings heading into the 2013 CFL Draft. He fell to 4th place in the December rankings. Following the 2012 CIS season, Charles was invited to the 2013 CFL Evaluation Camp in late-March 2013. After a successful CFL Combine, Charles climbed to become the 2nd ranked Canadian football prospect heading into the 2013 Draft. Charles was drafted by the Edmonton Eskimos with the 10th overall pick in the 2013 CFL Draft.

NFL Draft
Prior to the 2013 NFL Draft Charles gained interest from the following teams; Seattle Seahawks, Tennessee Titans, Indianapolis Colts, Houston Texans, Pittsburgh Steelers, Jacksonville Jaguars, Dallas Cowboys, and Atlanta Falcons. He also participated in the regional NFL Combine in Dallas, in April 2013. Despite the interest, Charles was not drafted by any team in the 2013 NFL Draft.

Tennessee Titans
Following the draft, Charles signed with the Tennessee Titans on May 9, 2013. He was waived on August 31, 2013, and was signed to the practice squad.

Buffalo Bills
On October 30, 2013, Charles was signed by the Buffalo Bills off the Titans' practice squad.

During the 2015 season, he appeared in 13 games (one start) for the Bills, racking up 13 total tackles (nine solo), one sack and one forced fumble.

Detroit Lions
On March 11, 2016, the Detroit Lions signed Charles to a one-year contract. He was placed on injured reserve on December 28, 2016.

Jacksonville Jaguars
On March 11, 2017, Charles signed with the Jacksonville Jaguars. He was released on September 3, 2017.

Kansas City Chiefs
On January 3, 2018, Charles signed a one-year contract with the Kansas City Chiefs. He was re-signed on March 19, 2018. He was released on May 8, 2018, but was re-signed two days later. He was released again on September 1, 2018.

San Antonio Commanders (AAF)
On February 19, 2019, Charles signed with the San Antonio Commanders of the AAF. He was waived on March 12, 2019.

Atlanta Falcons
On August 24, 2019, Charles was signed by the Atlanta Falcons. He was released on August 31, 2019.

Edmonton Eskimos 
On September 16, 2019, Charles signed with the Edmonton Eskimos of the Canadian Football League (CFL). The Eskimos had retained his playing rights after drafting him in the 2013 CFL Draft. He was placed on the practice roster for the duration of the regular season until he was moved to reserve roster for the East Semi-Final. He was then placed on the injured list for the team's East Final loss to the Hamilton Tiger-Cats and did not dress for a game in 2019. He did not play in 2020 due to the cancellation of the 2020 CFL season.

Ottawa Redblacks 
On February 9, 2021, Charles signed with the Ottawa Redblacks.

Edmonton Elks
Charles returned to the Edmonton Elks in free agency on February 9, 2022. However, he was released on May 16, 2022.

References

External links
Ottawa Redblacks bio

1988 births
Living people
American football defensive tackles
Atlanta Falcons players
Black Canadian players of American football
Buffalo Bills players
Canadian football defensive linemen
Detroit Lions players
Jacksonville Jaguars players
Kansas City Chiefs players
Ottawa Redblacks players
Players of Canadian football from Ontario
Regina Rams players
Sportspeople from Oshawa
Tennessee Titans players
San Antonio Commanders players